The men's trap at the 2016 Summer Olympics took place on 7–8 August 2016 at the National Shooting Center. There were 33 competitors from 24 nations.

The event was won by Croatian Josip Glasnović. It was the second consecutive victory for Croatia, with Giovanni Cernogoraz taking gold in 2012 (he finished 9th this time). Italy received its fourth consecutive silver medal in the men's trap; Giovanni Pellielo was already the only man to have won three medals in the event and now became the only one to have won four. Italy's podium streak reached five Games; three times for Pellielo from 2000 to 2008 and once for Massimo Fabbrizi in 2012 before this competition. Edward Ling's bronze put Great Britain back on the podium in the event for the first time since 2000.

The medals were presented by Danka Barteková, IOC member, Slovakia and Olegario Vázquez Raña, President of the International Shooting Sport Federation.

Background

This was the 22nd appearance of the men's ISSF Olympic trap event. The event was held at every Summer Olympics from 1896 to 1924 (except 1904, when no shooting events were held) and from 1952 to 2016; it was open to women from 1968 to 1992.

Two of the 6 finalists from the 2012 Games returned: gold medalist Giovanni Cernogoraz of Croatia and silver medalist Massimo Fabbrizi of Italy. Sixth-place finisher Anton Glasnović's brother, Josip, replaced him on the Croatian team. Giovanni Pellielo of Italy, a three-time medalist, also returned after an eighth-place finish in 2012 kept him out of the final. Pellielo had followed that with a 2013 World Championship, 2014 third-place finish, and 2015 second-place finish. The two-time reigning (2014 and 2015) World Champion, Erik Varga of Slovakia, was also competing in Rio de Janeiro.

Morocco made its debut in the event. Kuwaiti shooters competed as Independent Olympic Athletes. Great Britain made its 20th appearance, most among nations.

Qualification

Each National Olympic Committee (NOC) could enter up to two shooters if the NOC earned enough quota sports or had enough crossover-qualified shooters. To compete, a shooter needed a quota spot and to achieve a Minimum Qualification Score (MQS). Once a shooter was using a quota spot in any shooting event, they could enter any other shooting event for which they had achieved the MQS as well (a crossover qualification). There were 32 quota spots available for the trap event: 1 for the host nation, 3 at the 2014 World Championships, 1 at the 2014 American continental championships, 8 at the 2015 World Cup events, 1 at the 2015 African championships, 3 at the 2015 European championships, 2 at the 2015 World Championships, 2 at the 2015 Pan American Games, 2 at the 2015 Oceania championships, 4 at the 2016 Asian qualifying tournament, 1 invitational place, and 4 reallocated/exchanged quota. There was also 1 cross-over spot, used by Mohamed Ramah (qualified in double trap).

Competition format

The competition used a new format. The qualifying round remained the same. In the qualifier, each shooter fired 5 sets of 25 targets in trap shooting, with 10 targets being thrown to the left, 10 to the right, and 5 straight-away in each set. The shooters could take two shots at each target. Six shooters advanced.

Instead of a 6-person final round, however, the "semifinal" was introduced. The six shooters each faced 15 targets. The top two advanced to a head-to-head gold medal final, the next two went to a head-to-head bronze medal match, and the last two were ranked 5th and 6th. The finals again consisted of 15 targets. Only one shot could be taken at each target in the semifinal and finals.

Ties were broken using a shoot-off; additional shots are fired one at a time until there is no longer a tie.

Records

Prior to this competition, the existing world and Olympic records were as follows.

Schedule

All times are Brasilia Time (UTC-3)

Results

Qualifying round

Semifinal

Finals

Bronze medal match

Gold medal match

References

Shooting at the 2016 Summer Olympics
Trap at the Olympics
Men's events at the 2016 Summer Olympics